Eyriesia is a genus of freshwater snails in the family Viviparidae. 

There is one species in this genus: Eyriesia eyriesi (Morelet, 1865)

References

 Morelet, A., 1865. Addition à la faune malacologique de l'Indo-Chine. Journal de Conchyliologie 13: 225-228
 Brandt, R. A. M. (1974). The non-marine aquatic Mollusca of Thailand. Archiv für Molluskenkunde. 105: i-iv, 1-423

Viviparidae